Verkhyaya Sava is a rural locality (a selo) in Shagirtskoye Rural Settlement, Kuyedinsky District, Perm Krai, Russia. The population was 488 as of 2010. There are 8 streets.

Geography 
Verkhyaya Sava is located 40 km west of Kuyeda (the district's administrative centre) by road. Stepanovka is the nearest rural locality.

References 

Rural localities in Kuyedinsky District